Caroline Hallisey-Kepka (born September 24, 1980) is an American speed skater and three-time Olympian. She competed for the United States at the 1998, 2002, and 2006 Winter Olympics in short track speed skating.

Biography
Hallisey grew up in Natick, Massachusetts and began speed skating at a young age. Hallisey met bronze medallist J P Kepka at the United States Olympic Training Center in Colorado Springs; the two later married. She is the cousin of figure skater, Stephen Carriere. She is currently a member and coach at the Bay State Skate Club.

Following her retirement from speed skating in 2006, Hallisey attended the University of Colorado. She is currently a teacher at Glen Urquhart School in Beverly, Massachusetts.

Career

1998 Winter Olympics
At the 1998 Winter Olympics in Nagano, Hallisey competed in short track speed skating in the women's 3000 metre relay. She competed alongside teammates Amy Peterson, Erin Porter, and Cathy Turner. The team qualified for the small finals with a time of 4:33.352, and finished in fifth place with a time of 4:26.253.

2002 Winter Olympics
Hallisey returned in Salt Lake City, where she participated in her first individual Olympics events. Hallisey competed in the women's 500-metres, where she qualified for the finals. She finished in fifth place with a time of 44.679, five hundredths of a second behind first place. She also competed in the women's 1000-metres, and made it to the quarterfinals, but falling short of qualifying for the finals.

In the women's 3000 metre relay, Hallisey competed with Julie Goskowicz, Amy Peterson, and Erin Porter. The team placed fourth in the semifinals with a time of 4:36.002, qualifying them for the small finals. Overall, the team ranked seventh at a time of 4:20.730.

2006 Winter Olympics
Hallisey's final Olympics was in Turin. The United States' women's 3000 metre relay team consisted of Hallisey, Allison Baver, Maria Garcia, and Hyo-jung Kim. In the semi-finals, the team placed third, qualifying for the small finals with a time of 4:18.333. The team ranked fourth overall due to the disqualification of the Chinese team, with a time of 4:18.740.

References

External links
 

1980 births
Living people
American female short track speed skaters
Olympic short track speed skaters of the United States
Short track speed skaters at the 1998 Winter Olympics
Short track speed skaters at the 2002 Winter Olympics
Short track speed skaters at the 2006 Winter Olympics
People from Natick, Massachusetts
Sportspeople from Middlesex County, Massachusetts
University of Colorado alumni
21st-century American women